Le Mans is a city in northwestern France on the Sarthe River where it meets the Huisne. Traditionally the capital of the province of Maine, it is now the capital of the Sarthe department and the seat of the Roman Catholic diocese of Le Mans. Le Mans is a part of the Pays de la Loire region.

Its inhabitants are called Manceaux (male) and Mancelles (female). Since 1923, the city has hosted the 24 Hours of Le Mans, the world's oldest active endurance sports car race.

History

First mentioned by Claudius Ptolemy, the Roman city Vindinium was the capital of the Aulerci, a sub tribe of the Aedui. Le Mans is also known as Civitas Cenomanorum (City of the Cenomani), or Cenomanus. Their city, seized by the Romans in 47 BC, was within the ancient Roman province of Gallia Lugdunensis. A 3rd-century amphitheatre is still visible. The thermae were demolished during the crisis of the third century when workers were mobilized to build the city's defensive walls. The ancient wall around Le Mans is one of the most complete circuits of Gallo-Roman city walls to survive.

As the use of the French language replaced late Vulgar Latin in the area, Cenomanus, with dissimilation, became known as Celmans. Cel- was taken to be a form of the French word for "this" and "that", and was replaced by le, which means "the".

As the principal city of Maine, Le Mans was the stage for struggles in the eleventh century between the counts of Anjou and the dukes of Normandy. When the Normans had control of Maine, William the Conqueror successfully invaded England and established an occupation. In 1069 the citizens of Maine revolted and expelled the Normans, resulting in Hugh V being proclaimed count of Maine. Geoffrey V of Anjou married Matilda of England in the cathedral. Their son Henry II Plantagenet, king of England, was born here. In 1154, during the reign of his uncle King Stephen, Henry landed in England with an army, intent on challenging Stephen for the throne. Some of the members of that feudal force were known by the surname 'del Mans' (Latin for of Mans, as the city was then known.) In medieval records pertaining to the history of Gloucester is a reference to one such man, Walter del Mans, and beside his name 'Cenomanus' was added by the medieval scribe, so that there is no doubt as to Walter's origin. In the English censuses down to the twentieth century the surname Mans (latterly often spelled Manns) was virtually confined to the counties of Gloucestershire and Herefordshire and their borderlands, reflecting the original settlement patterns in the Welsh Marches of the original followers of Henry's from Le Mans in 1154. A John Mans/Manns was escheator of Hereford 1399–1400. One family from [Le] Mans held the manor of Dodenham, Worcestershire. (Calendar of the Records of the Corporation of Gloucester, Item 96, ca.1200; Fine Roles Henry III, 23 August. 1233 [Hereford];'Parishes: Doddenham', A History of the County of Worcester, volume 4 (1924), pp. 260–62.) Intercourse between England and Le Mans continued throughout the Angevin period.

In the 13th century Le Mans came under the control of the French crown.  It was subsequently invaded by England during the Hundred Years' War.

Industrialization took place in the 19th century which saw the development of railway and motor vehicle production as well as textiles and tobacco manufacture.

Wilbur Wright began official public demonstrations of the airplane he had developed with his younger brother Orville on 8 August 1908, at the Hunaudières horse racing track near Le Mans.

World War II
Soon after Le Mans was liberated by the U.S. 79th and 90th Infantry Divisions on 8 August 1944, engineers of the Ninth Air Force IX Engineering Command began construction of a combat Advanced Landing Ground outside of the town. The airfield was declared operational on 3 September and designated as "A-35". It was used by several American fighter and transport units until late November of that year in additional offensives across France; the airfield was closed.

Main sights
 Le Mans has a well-preserved old town (Cité Plantagenêt, also called Vieux Mans) and the Cathédrale St-Julien, dedicated to St Julian of Le Mans, who is honoured as the city's first bishop.
 Remnants of a Roman wall are visible in the old town and Roman baths are located by the river. These walls are highlighted every summer (July and August) evening in a light show that tells the history of the town.
 Arboretum de la Grand Prée
Notre-Dame de la Couture, medieval church
Notre Dame de Sainte Croix, neogothic church
 Part of the former Cistercian abbey de l'Epau, founded by Queen Berengaria and currently maintained in extensive grounds by the Département de la Sarthe.
 Jardin des Plantes du Mans
 Musée de la reine Bérengère, a museum of Le Mans history located in a gothic manor house.
 Musée de Tessé, the fine arts museum of the city, displaying painting (including artworks by Philippe de Champaigne, Charles Le Brun, François Boucher, John Constable, Ingres, Théodore Géricault and Camille Corot) and archaeological collections as well as decorative arts.

Gallery

Climate
Le Mans has an oceanic climate influenced by the mild Atlantic air travelling inland. Summers are warm and occasionally hot, whereas winters are mild and cloudy. Precipitation is relatively uniform and moderate year round.

Demographics
, there were 367,082 inhabitants in the metropolitan area (aire d'attraction) of Le Mans, with 143,252 of these living in the city proper (commune). In 1855 Le Mans absorbed four neighbouring communes. The population data for 1851 and earlier in the table and graph below refer to the pre-1855 borders.

Transportation
The Gare du Mans is the main railway station of Le Mans. It takes 1 hour to reach Paris from Le Mans by TGV high speed train. There are also TGV connections to Lille, Marseille, Nantes, Rennes and Brest. Gare du Mans is also a hub for regional trains. Le Mans inaugurated a new light rail system on 17 November 2007.

Sport

Motorsport

The first French Grand Prix took place on a 64-mile (103 km) circuit based at Le Mans in 1906.

Since the 1920s, the city has been best known for its connection with motorsports. There are two official and separate racing tracks at Le Mans, though they share certain portions. The smaller is the Bugatti Circuit (named after Ettore Bugatti, founder of the car company bearing his name), a relatively short permanent circuit, which is used for racing throughout the year and has hosted the French motorcycle Grand Prix. The longer and more famous Circuit de la Sarthe is composed partly of public roads. These are closed to the public when the track is in use for racing. Since 1923, this route has been used for the famous 24 Hours of Le Mans sports car endurance race. Boutiques and shops are set up during the race, selling merchandise and promoting products for cars.

The "Le Mans start" was formerly used in the 24-hour race: drivers lined up across the track from their cars, ran across the track, jumped into their cars and started them to begin the race.

The 1955 Le Mans disaster was a large accident during the race that killed eighty-four spectators.

Basketball
The city is home to Le Mans Sarthe Basket, 2006 Champion of the LNB Pro A, France's top professional basketball division.

The team plays its home games at the Antarès, which served as one of the host arenas of the FIBA EuroBasket 1999.

Football
Le Mans FC

Cycling
Circuit de la Sarthe (cycling)

Notable people

Le Mans was the birthplace of:

 Elijah ben Menahem Ha-Zaken, born 980
 Henry II of England, born 1133
 Geoffroy V d'Anjou, born 1113
 Geoffrey de Goreham or Gorron, became Abbot of St Albans, Hertfordshire, UK in 1119
 Dom Louis Le Pelletier, born 1663, linguist of the Breton language 
 Gilles-François de Beauvais, born 7 July 1693, Jesuit writer and preacher
 Basil Moreau, born 1799, priest of Le Mans, founded the Congregation of Holy Cross, beatified in Le Mans in 2007
 Léon Bollée, born 1870, car manufacturer and inventor
 Christine and Lea Papin, whose murder (1933) of their employers inspired Jean Genêt's The Maids
 Jean Françaix, born in 1912, composer
 Jean Rondeau, born in 1946, race car driver and constructor
 Jean-Yves Empereur born 1952, archeologist
 Bertrand Lançon, born 1952, Roman history scholar
 François Fillon, born in 1954, former Prime Minister of France
 Yves Jumeau, born in 1955, visual artist
 François Vallejo, born 1960, novelist
 Sylvie Tolmont, born 1962, politician
 Sabine Toutain, born in 1966, violist
 Doan Bui, (born in the 1970s), journalist
Amaelle Landais-Israël, born 1977, climatologist
 Emmanuel Moire, born 1979, French singer
 Sébastien Bourdais, born 1979, race car driver
 Jo-Wilfried Tsonga, born 1985, professional tennis player
 Guillaume Loriot, footballer
 Leslie, born 4 February 1985, French singer
 Louis Rossi born 1989, Grand Prix motorcycle racer
 Emma Mackey, born 1996, French-British actress

Notable residents include:
 Gilles Villeneuve, lived temporarily in Le Mans in 1973.
 Gérard Genette, literary theorist, lived and taught in Le Mans from 1956 to 1963. 
 Jacques Derrida, philosopher, lived and taught in Le Mans in 1959–1960. 
 David Jason, English actor, lived in Le Mans between 1965–1968 and 1999–2001.
 Andy Wallace, born 1961, racecar driver.

Died in Le Mans:
 Liborius of Le Mans (c. 348–397), bishop of Le Mans
 André d'Arbelles (1767–1825), journalist and historiographer
Lawrence Aubrey Wallace (1857–1942) British Colonial Administrator

International relations

Le Mans is twinned with:

 Bolton, England, United Kingdom
 Haouza, Western Sahara
 Paderborn, Germany
 Rostov-on-Don, Russia
 Suzuka, Japan
 Volos, Greece
 Xianyang, China

Gastronomy
The culinary specialty of Le Mans is rillettes, a shredded pork pâté.

Landmarks
Located at Mayet near Le Mans, the Le Mans-Mayet transmitter has a height of 342 m and is one of the tallest radio masts in France.

Representation in popular culture
Le Mans has been a setting for numerous feature films that feature its famous race.
Le Mans is a setting for sections of the 2020 novel, The Invisible Life of Addie LaRue, by V.E. Schwab.

See also
 The Cenomanian Age of the Cretaceous Period of geological time is named for Cenomanus (Gallo-Roman Le Mans)
Communes of the Sarthe department

Notes

References

Bibliography

External links

 Official website 
 Le Mans d'Antan 

 
Communes of Sarthe
Prefectures in France
Cenomani
Gallia Lugdunensis
 
Cities in France